Peter Edward Wililam Trembling (born March 1962) is a former chairman of Notts County football club.

He was introduced to the club as the representative of Munto Finance, and in December 2009 purchased the club from them for a nominal amount. He later sold the club to a consortium of buyers from Lincoln headed by Ray Trew.

Trembling worked in the credit card industry, and combined this with his leisure interest to become Head of Sport at MBNA. He helped several football clubs launch their own credit cards, and this later led to a move to Everton F.C. as commercial director. He was approached by Nathan Willett of Munto to become Chairman of Notts County and fronted their takeover of the club.

References

Living people
Notts County F.C. non-playing staff
Everton F.C. non-playing staff
People from Sandiacre
1962 births